is a Japanese actress and a former singer. Takimoto debuted in 2003 as a singer of the girl group Sweets, where she performed under the name Miori. After Sweets disbanded, Takimoto appeared on television as an actress.

Biography 
Miori Takimoto was born in Tottori, Tottori Prefecture, and began her professional career as a member of the former group SweetS, signed by avex. She was chosen from the avex trax 2002–2003 auditions, and the group debuted on August 27, 2003. During these years, she had side projects such as modelling for magazines and acting in Waseda Academy commercials. Miori and her fellow ex-SweetS members parted ways on June 7, 2006.

Upon leaving the music business, she pursued a career in acting. She appeared in a music video for Himari in November 2007. Miori signed with Stardust and since then has appeared in the film Higanjima, Yui's "Never Say Die" music video, and commercials. In November 2014, she debuted with the band Lagoon (ラグーン) as the vocalist.

Works

TV dramas 
 Teppan (NHK, 2010–2011), Akari Murakami
 Ikemen desu ne (美男ですね) (TBS, 2011), Mio Sakuraba
 Hungry! (ハングリー！) (KTV, 2012), role of Chie Okusu
 Mike-Neko Holmes no Suiri Episode 2 (NTV, 2012), Ryōko Kanezaki
 Miyuki Miyabe 4-shū Renzoku Mystery "Level 7" (TBS, 2012), Mai Shingyōji
 GTO (NTV, 2012), Azusa Fuyutsuki
 Aki mo Oni Abare Special (2012)
 Shōgatsu Special! Fuyuyasumi mo Nekketsu Jugyō da (2013)
 Kanketsu-hen: Saraba Onizuka! Sotsugyō Special (2013)
 Miyuki Miyabe Mystery "Perfect Blue" (TBS, 2012), Kayoko Hasumi
 Tsuma wa, Kunoichi (NHK BS Premium, 2013), Orie
 Umi no Ueno Shinryōjo Episode 4 (Fuji TV, 2013), Michiru Fujii
 Dr.DMAT (TBS, 2014), Haruko Yakumo
 Satsujin Hensachi 70 (NTV, 2014), Rikako Mayama
 Cabin Attendant Keiji: New York Satsujin Jiken (Fuji TV, 2014), Yui Watabe
 Tsuma wa, Kunoichi: Saishūshō (NHK BS Premium, 2014), Orie
 Hula Girl to Inu no Choco (TV Tokyo, 2015), Sae Morita
 Keisei Saimin no Otoko Part 2 "Kobayashi Ichizō: Yume to Soroban" (NHK, 2015), Kou Tanba/Kou Kobayashi
 Final Life (2017), Kana Ayatsuji
 Auditor Shuhei Nozaki (2018)
 Fubuki Koshiji Monogatari (2018), Fubuki Koshiji
 Brother and Sister (2018), Sachi
Unmei Kara Hajimaru Koi: You Are My Destiny (2020), Aya Sato

Films 
 Higanjima (2010), Yuki
 Shokudou Katatsumuri (2010)
 Kaze Tachinu 風立ちぬ (The Wind Rises) (2013), Voice of Naoko Satomi
 Sadako 3D 2 (貞子3D2) (2013), Fūko Andō
 Tensai Bakavon: Yomigaeru Flanders no Inu (2015), Voice of Nero
 Hokusai (2021), Koto

Commercials 
 Circle K Bakery (2004)
 Waseda Academy (2005)
 Sony Sonpo Campaign (2009)
 Astellas Pharma Inc. and Pfizer Ltd. (2009)
 Asahi Soft Drinks "Mitsuya Cider" (2011)
 Asahi Fiber Glass "Aclear" (2011)
 Toyo Suisan (2012)
 Bourbon "Slow Bar" (2012)
 Godiva Chocolatier Short Movie 2014 (2014)
 Lixil (2014)

TV animations 
 Magic Kaito 1412 (まじっく快斗1412) (YTV, 2015), Jody Hopper

Music Videos 
 2007 – Himari's "Akeneiro, Sora no Shita"
 2009 – Fukuramu SUKURAMU's "Natsu no Hi"
 2009 – YUI's "Never Say Die"
 2010 – Stereophony's "Hanbunko"

Live Performances 
 December 27, 2009 – 3-B Junior Live
 February 14, 2010 – 3-B Junior Special Valentine's Live

Dubbing 
 Clarice (Clarice Starling (Rebecca Breeds))

Bibliography

Books 
 SDP Bunko Dai 3-dan: Mori Ougai "Takasebune" (November 17, 2008, SDP), cover 
 Takimoto Miori Photobook "Issho ni Hashiro!!" (August 10, 2013, Kadokawa Media House)

Magazines 
 Mina, Shufunotomo 2011–, a serialized photo "Can be a Heroine" since March 2012

Awards 
15th Nikkan Sports Drama Grand Prix (Jul–Sept 2011): Best Actress for Ikemen desu ne
68th Television Drama Academy Awards: Special Award – Teppan

References

External links 
  
 Stardust Promotion profile 
 

1991 births
21st-century Japanese actresses
Japanese women pop singers
Japanese idols
Japanese female models
Living people
Stardust Promotion artists
Actors from Tottori Prefecture
Musicians from Tottori Prefecture
Asadora lead actors
21st-century Japanese women singers